Running the Sahara is a 2007 documentary feature film that chronicles Ray Zahab, Charlie Engle, and Kevin Lin's attempt to run across the entire Sahara Desert. They traveled a total of 6920 kilometers, reaching the Red Sea on February 20, 2007.

Producers Marc Joubert, Keith Quinn, Larry Tanz and director James Moll filmed on location in Africa across six countries: Senegal, Mauritania, Mali, Niger, Libya, Egypt. Prepare2go.com supported the film crew with the logistics throughout.

References

External links
The Official Running the Sahara Website

Documentary films about sportspeople
Films set in Egypt
Films set in Libya
Films set in Mali
Films set in Mauritania
Films set in Niger
Films set in Senegal
Films shot in Egypt
Films shot in Libya
Films shot in Mali
Films shot in Mauritania
Films shot in Niger
Films shot in Senegal
American sports documentary films
English-language Malian films
2007 films
2007 documentary films
Sahara
Films directed by James Moll
Documentary films about Africa
2000s English-language films
2000s American films